This lists the singles that reached number one on the Spanish Promusicae sales and airplay charts in 2013. Total sales correspond to the data sent by regular contributors to sales volumes and by digital distributors. There is a two-day difference between the reporting period from sales outlets and from radio stations. For example, the report period for the first full week of 2013 ended on January 6 for sales and on January 4 for airplay.

Chart history

References

Spain
 Number-one singles
2013

nl:Nummer 1-hits in de Spaanse single top 50 in 2012